Ryan Keith Whiting (born November 24, 1986) is an American track and field athlete who competes in the shot put and has a personal record of 22.28 meters outdoors and 22.35 meters indoors. His biggest international senior success to date is first place at the 2012 World Indoor Championships. He represented the United States at the 2011 World Championships in Athletics, 2013 World Championships in Athletics, 2014 IAAF World Indoor Championships  and the 2012 London Olympics.

He competed for the Arizona State Sun Devils collegiately and won six NCAA titles while there. He was the 2011, 2013, 2014 American indoor champion.

Early life and career
Ryan Whiting was born in Harrisburg, Pennsylvania, the son of Kent and Jill Whiting. Whiting attended Central Dauphin High School and started competing in shot put and discus throw events as a teenager. Whiting made his international debut at the 2005 Pan American Junior Athletics Championships, where he won both events with personal record marks. He was chosen as the Gatorade Male Track and Field Athlete of the year, ranking him as the top American high school track-and-fielder. Entering the senior ranks, he cleared 19 metres in the shot put for the first time at the USA Indoor Track and Field Championships, placing eighth with a throw of 19.36 m.

He started a majoring in civil engineering at Arizona State University in 2006 and began competing athletically for the Arizona State Sun Devils in 2007. Outdoors he was third at the Pac-10 championships and fourth at the NCAA Men's Outdoor Track and Field Championship.

NCAA titles
Whiting was much improved in his second season for the Sun Devils and secured the NCAA Indoor title in the shot put with a throw of  – this was an American collegiate indoor record and raised him to thirteenth on the all-time indoor lists. He did not bring his indoor form to the outdoor season and was runner-up in the shot at both the Pac-10 and NCAA outdoor championships. He also ranked top ten in the discus at the NCAA meet and placed sixth in the shot put at the USA Outdoor Track and Field Championships. He performed well at the season-ending 2008 NACAC Under-23 Championships in Athletics, taking the shot put gold and discus silver medals.

In his third year of competition for Arizona State, he was dominant in collegiate events. He had a string of victories outdoors, taking the Pac-10, NCAA West, and NCAA Outdoor titles. He also qualified for the NCAA finals in the discus throw and finished as runner-up by a narrow margin. He again was ranked top ten in the shot put at the USA national championships.

In his final season for the Sun Devils he won a third NCAA indoor title with a throw of 21.52 m. He swept the Pac-10 outdoor shot put and discus throw titles before going on to claim the same double at the NCAA Outdoor Championships. In winning the shot put title, he threw a mark of  – a personal record and three centimetres off the overall collegiate record of 22 metres held by John Godina.

Over the course of his four years competing for Arizona State University, he earned nine NCAA All-American honours and six NCAA titles (three indoor shot put, two outdoor shot put, one discus). The U.S. Track & Field and Cross Country Coaches Association selected him as the American indoor performer of the year for 2008. In addition, he excelled off the field with his studies: he was twice chosen for the second team of the Academic All-America student-athlete program and received a number of Pac-10 and USTFCCCA All-Academic honours.

Professional career

Whiting signed up with Nike Inc. in 2010, while still at Arizona State, and began to compete on the American track and field circuit that year. He was runner-up to Christian Cantwell at the 2010 USA Indoor Championships and placed fifth at the USA Outdoors. Following his graduation from Arizona State in 2010, he began to focus on shot putting full-time. Returning to his native Pennsylvania, Whiting became a volunteer coach on the Penn State University track and field staff. He secured his first national title at the 2011 USA Indoor Championships, easily beating second-placed Dan Taylor. He came fourth at the 2011 USA Outdoor Track and Field Championships, but because Cantwell automatically entered as defending champion, Whiting still gained a spot for the 2011 World Championships in Athletics. On his global debut, he came seventh in the men's shot put final. He also performed well on the IAAF Diamond League circuit, having top three finishes on the Doha, Lausanne and Zürich legs in 2011. In 2012, Ryan was USA indoor runner-up.

He did not match this form outdoors that year, but still managed a number of podium finishes on the 2011 IAAF Diamond League circuit (Shanghai, Stockholm and Zürich). His best outdoor throw of the year came at the 2012 United States Olympic Trials, where his mark of  	21.66 m brought him second place behind Reese Hoffa. Representing the United States at the Olympics for the first time, he reached his second outdoor global final, this time placing ninth with a mark of 20.64 m.

Whiting finished 1st in the Shot Put on 7 March 2014 at the 2014 IAAF World Indoor Championships.

Personal life
He has two brothers, Evan and Ross. He married his wife, Ashley, in 2011.

Major competition record

Personal bests

All information taken from IAAF profile.

See also
List of Pennsylvania State University Olympians

References

External links
Official website

 USATF profile for Ryan Whiting

1986 births
Living people
American male shot putters
Sportspeople from Harrisburg, Pennsylvania
Track and field athletes from Pennsylvania
Arizona State Sun Devils men's track and field athletes
Athletes (track and field) at the 2012 Summer Olympics
Olympic track and field athletes of the United States
Diamond League winners
USA Outdoor Track and Field Championships winners
USA Indoor Track and Field Championships winners
World Athletics Indoor Championships winners